James Preston O'Donnell (July 30, 1917 – April 16, 1990) was an American author and journalist.

Biography 
O'Donnell was educated at Harvard University and worked as a journalist, mostly for magazines. He was a friend of the Kennedy family. During World War II he served in the U.S. Army Signal Corps until July 2, 1945, when he was discharged. He became Newsweek magazine's German bureau chief. In this capacity, he arrived in Berlin on July 4. He was assigned to investigate Hitler's death and to obtain information as to Eva Braun.

O'Donnell bribed the Soviet soldier guarding the entrance to Hitler's Berlin bunker becoming the first non-Soviet to examine it. He found and took numerous top secret Nazi documents. After using these documents and interviews with many of the last occupants of the Führerbunker in his later publications, he became an authority on the death of Adolf Hitler, and ultimately published his collected findings in his 1975 book, The Bunker.

After his tenure with Newsweek, O'Donnell worked for many years as a freelance journalist in Germany, and published pieces in magazines ranging from Life magazine to The Saturday Evening Post.

He later joined the U.S. State Department as an adviser on Berlin. He spent his last years as a journalism professor at Boston University. In 2011, historian Niall Ferguson credited O'Donnell as one of the few Western observers who accurately foresaw the fall of the Berlin Wall.

In the 1981 CBS television movie The Bunker, O'Donnell is portrayed by actor James Naughton in a brief scene at the beginning.

Books

Articles 
 O'Donnell, James P. "I Cruised the Rhine on a Marshall-Plan Barge." The Saturday Evening Post, 3 September 1949.
 O'Donnell, James P. "The Ghost Train of Berlin." Das Beste, January 1979. (German)

References

Other sources

 Ferguson, Niall. Civilization: The West and the Rest. New York: Penguin Books, 2011, .

1917 births
1990 deaths
Harvard University alumni
Boston University faculty
American male journalists
20th-century American journalists
Historians of Nazism
20th-century American historians
20th-century American male writers
United States Army personnel of World War II